Parminder Singh may refer to:
 Parminder Singh (footballer)
 Parminder Singh (rower)